Lethe  ramadeva,   the  single silverstripe, is a species of Satyrinae butterfly found in the  Indomalayan realm (Sikkim, Bhutan, Yunnan).

References

ramadeva
Butterflies of Asia